Karl Werner Aspenström (13 November 1918 – 25 January 1997) was a Swedish poet.

Born at Norrbärke, he was a member of the Swedish Academy, where he held Seat 12 from 1981 to 1997. Following his breakthrough in 1949 with Snölegend ("Snow legend") he was considered one of the leading 20th-century Swedish poets, and his poetry has often been compared to the works of the Nobel Prize laureates Harry Martinson and Tomas Tranströmer. Aspenström claimed that his motivation for writing was "writing for his cat".

He was a friend of Stig Dagerman. His widow died in 2015.

Selected works
 Förberedelse (1943)
 Oändligt är vårt äventyr (prose, 1945)
 Skriket och tystnaden (1946)
 Snölegend (1949)
 Litania (1952)
 Förebud (1953)
 Hundarna (1954)
 Dikter under träden (1956)
 Bäcken (prose, 1958)
 Motsägelser (essays, 1961)
 Om dagen om natten (1961)
 Trappan (1964)
 Sommar (prose, 1968)
 Inre (1969)
 Under tiden (1972)
 Tidigt en morgon, sent på jorden (1980)
 Sorl (1983)
 Det röda molnet (1986)
 Varelser (1988)
 Enskilt och allmänt (1991)
 Ty (1993)
 Israpport (1997)
 Öva Sitt Eget (2004) (posthumous, co-written with Signe Lund-Aspenström)
 Samlade dikter 1943-1997 (Collected poems 1943-1997, 2014)

References

1918 births
1997 deaths
People from Smedjebacken Municipality
Writers from Dalarna
Swedish-language poets
Swedish male poets
Burials at Maria Magdalena Church
20th-century Swedish poets
20th-century Swedish male writers
Members of the Swedish Academy